Messengers were a Scottish new wave duo consisting of Danny Mitchell (keyboards and programming) and Colin King (vocals and percussion). The duo were originally part of Modern Man, a Glasgow post-punk/new wave band discovered by Midge Ure of Ultravox. Modern Man disbanded after releasing one album produced by Ure, Concrete Scheme (1980), after which Ure stayed as producer with Mitchell and King as Messengers. 

Messengers toured as support band to Ultravox, contributing to the live album Monument (1982), and with Mitchell co-writing Midge Ure's "If I Was". Enough material for an album was recorded by 1984, but Ure's label Chrysalis declined to release an album after offering a three singles deal only.

An album was finally released in November 2004 when Mitchell and King re-recorded many of their songs, written during the period of 1979 and 1985, for release via the official Ultravox website.  Of the thirteen tracks released on the album, only three were new compositions: "(Did) You Take Me For A Ride", "Send That Letter Home" and "The Reformation Waltz".

Discography

Messengers

Album
...It's Been Twenty Years, Let's Try Turning Up the Volume... (10 November 2004), MESSCD200401

Singles
All tracks written by Daniel Mitchell/Colin King, except "I Turn In (To You)" and "Plains of Siberia" by Daniel Mitchell and "Andy Warhol" by David Bowie.
"I Turn In (To You)" / "The Semi-Professionals (Theme No. 1)" (3 December 1982), Chrysalis Records
"I Turn In (To You) (Extended Version)" / "The Semi-Professionals (Theme No. 1)" (3 December 1982), Chrysalis Records
"Great Institutions" / "Here Come the Heroes" (June 1984), Chrysalis Records
"Great Institutions (MF Mix)" / "Here Come the Heroes", "Strawboy (recorded live at Hammersmith Odeon, Dec 1982)" (June 1984), Chrysalis Records
"Frontiers" / "Plains of Siberia" (28 September 1984), Chrysalis Records
"Frontiers (Extended Version)" / "Plains of Siberia", "Andy Warhol" (28 September 1984), Chrysalis Records

Tracks recorded and mixed at DBS by Father Dan. Vocals recorded at Carlton Studios, Glasgow.

Modern Man

Album
Concrete Scheme (12 September 1980), MAM Records

Singles
All tracks written by Danny Mitchell, except "Things Could Be Better" by Jim Cook.
"All the Little Idiots" / "Advance" (15 August 1980), MAM Records
"Body Music" / "I Couldn't Stop" (31 October 1980), MAM Records
"Things Could Be Better" / "Wastelands" (13 February 1981), MAM Records
"Things Could Be Better" (12″ mix) / "Wastelands" (13 February 1981), MAM Records
"War Drums" / "Tell Us Lies" (31 July 1981), MAM Records

Personnel
 Danny Mitchell – guitar and synthesizer
 Jim Cook – lead vocal
 Mike Moran – bass
 Ali McLeod – lead guitar
 Colin King – drums and vocals
 All tracks written by Danny Mitchell
 Produced by Midge Ure
 Engineer - Brian Young
 Recorded at Cava Studios, Glasgow

References

Scottish new wave musical groups
New wave duos
Musical groups from Glasgow
Chrysalis Records artists